Internet access in Tanzania, a country in East Africa, began in 1995. Within 5 years, 115,000 people were connected to the Internet. Since then, there has been significant growth.

Statistics

In June 2010, a Tanzania Communications Regulatory Authority review found that internet penetration was approximately 11%, or approximately 4.8 million Tanzanian users. 5% of those used internet cafes, 40% had access via an organisation or institution, and the remainder accessed the internet from a household connection. By 2014, there were twice as many users using the Internet for personal reasons than work reasons. By 2015, about 11% of households in Tanzania had internet access. The CIA World Factbook assessed internet penetration in 2016 at 13%. By mid-2017, the TCRA's figures were that 40% of Tanzania's 57 million population had internet access, due mainly to an increase in smartphone access. In contrast, there were 1.2 million fixed wireless connections and 629,474 fixed wired ones.

References

Tan